Godešič (in older sources also Godešiče) is a village on the right bank of the Sora River in the Municipality of Škofja Loka in the Upper Carniola region of Slovenia.

Name
Godešič was attested in written sources in 1022–1023 as Niusazinhun, and later as Nivsaze (1160), Niuznsaezze (1214), and Nivsaez (1291). The modern Slovene name—originally plural, *Godešiči—is a patronymic derived from the hypocorism *Godešь, probably referring to an early settler of the village.

Church

The local church is dedicated to Saint Nicholas and is Romanesque in its origins based on archaeological evidence of an apse found when the floor of the current church was being renovated. At the end of the 14th century a Gothic church was built on the site; a painted east facade, dated to c. 1400, survives. The church was expanded in 1852. Inside, 16th-century frescos by Jernej of Loka survive in the sanctuary.

Notable people
Notable people that were born or lived in Godešič include:
Anton Hafner (1887–1918), soldier and leader of the Judenburg Rebellion
Anja Čarman (born 1985), Slovene swimmer, multiple European swimming championships medalist

References

External links 

Godešič at Geopedia

Populated places in the Municipality of Škofja Loka